Leslie Spencer Tai Cheuk-yin is a Hong Kong politician. He was the last chairman of the pro-Republic of China (Taiwan) Hong Kong political organisation 123 Democratic Alliance.

Tai contested the Hong Kong Legislative Council by-election in 2010, but was not elected.

Notes

Hong Kong people
Living people
District councillors of Central and Western District
123 Democratic Alliance politicians
Year of birth missing (living people)